Wehbe is a surname. Notable people with the surname include:

Charbel Wehbe (born 1953), Lebanese politician
Haifa Wehbe (born 1976), Lebanese singer and actress
Jason Wehbe (born 1992), Lebanese footballer
Jorge Wehbe (1920–1998), Argentine lawyer, economist and politician
Mikhail Wehbe (born 1942), Syrian diplomat
Nancy Oshana Wehbe (born 1975), Assyrian-American bodybuilder
Anthony Wehbe (born 1980), American Physician and Healthcare Executive 
Adrian Wehbe (born 2003), American-Lebanese wiki editor on FANDOM

References